The official residence of the president is provided by the government of the Republic of China for the President, while in office, along with his or her family. 

The current official residence is at the intersection of Chongqing South Road Section 2 and Aiguo West Road, Zhongzheng, Taipei, and has been in use since Lee Teng-hui's presidency. Security of the residence is maintained by the Sixth Special Corps of the National Police Agency along with a wall along the perimeter of the complex.

The Vice President's official residence is separate from that of the President's. The current official residence is on Renai Road Section 3.

Presidential residences 
The name of the presidential official residence is the same as the code name, picked by the President, used by the National Security Bureau for the President's security detail. The name "official residence" and "residence" were used by different presidents depending on their preference.

Code names
The official residence of the President and Vice President takes on a different alias depending on the code name assigned by the National Security Bureau. The code name is usually selected depending on the current state of the nation, the transfer of power between political parties, or the incoming President's style of governance and ideals.

President

Vice president

References

 
Code names